The Jim Little House was a historic house on East Walnut Street, between North Front and North Second Streets, in Bradford, Arkansas.  It was a T-shaped wood-frame structure, with a gable roof, novelty siding, and vernacular style.  It was built in 1895, and was one of White County's few surviving 19th-century houses.

The house was listed on the National Register of Historic Places in 1991.  It has been listed as destroyed in the Arkansas Historic Preservation Program database.

See also
National Register of Historic Places listings in White County, Arkansas

References

Houses on the National Register of Historic Places in Arkansas
Houses completed in 1895
Houses in White County, Arkansas
Demolished buildings and structures in Arkansas
National Register of Historic Places in White County, Arkansas
1895 establishments in Arkansas